Guam competed at the 2020 Summer Olympics in Tokyo. Originally scheduled to take place from 24 July to 9 August 2020, the Games were postponed to 23 July to 8 August 2021, because of the COVID-19 pandemic. It was the nation's ninth consecutive appearance at the Summer Olympics.

Competitors
The following is the list of number of competitors in the Games.

Athletics

Guam received universality slots from IAAF to send a female track and field athlete to the Olympics.

Track & road events

Judo
 
Guam entered one male judoka  into the Olympic tournament based on the International Judo Federation Olympics Individual Ranking.

Swimming 

Guam qualified two swimmers in two events.

Wrestling

For the first time since London 2012, Guam qualified one wrestler for the women's freestyle 53 kg into the Olympic competition, by progressing to the top two finals at the 2021 African & Oceania Qualification Tournament in Hammamet, Tunisia.

Freestyle

References

Nations at the 2020 Summer Olympics
2020
2021 in Guamanian sports